Valerie Gross is a German record producer of classical music. Gross won the 2006 Grammy Award in the category of Best Opera Recording for  Osvaldo Golijov's 2006 album Ainadamar.

References

Living people
Grammy Award winners
Year of birth missing (living people)
German women record producers
Classical music producers
Place of birth missing (living people)